Sakhteman-e Hajji Soleyman (also Romanized as Sākhtemān-e Ḩājjī Soleymān) is a village in Qarah Bulaq Rural District, Sheshdeh and Qarah Bulaq District, Fasa County, Fars Province, Iran. At the 2006 census, its population was 382, in 82 families.

References 

Populated places in Fasa County